Cow Hug Day is an annual event announced in India in February 2023, encouraging the show of love towards cows by hugging them. The Animal Welfare Board of India in a notification  asked cow lovers across India to observe Cow Hug Day on February 14 in place of  Valentine's Day, and said that it would "bring emotional richness" and "will increase our individual and collective happiness".

A day after, a notification was published by Animal Welfare Board of India to withdraw Cow Hug day amid a flood of memes on social media.

Cow cuddling 
Some people have reported experiences of contentment and peace by cuddling cows, including during the COVID-19 lockdowns in the United States.

See also 

 Animal welfare
 Anthrozoology
 Cattle in religion and mythology 
 Emotion in animals
 Human–animal communication  
 Human interaction with cats 
 Interspecies friendship
Pet

References

Observances in India
2023 introductions
February observances
Unofficial observances
Cattle in popular culture